Joseph Olivier may refer to:

 Joseph Olivier (rugby union) (1874–1901), French rugby union player
 Joseph Olivier (politician), mayor of Longueuil, Quebec; commonly known as Jacques

See also

Joseph Oliver (disambiguation)